, is one of the original 40 throws of Judo as developed by Jigoro Kano. It belongs to the fifth group, Gokyo, of the traditional throwing list, Gokyo-no-Nagewaza, of Kodokan Judo. It is also part of the current 67 Throws of Kodokan Judo.
It is classified as a hip throwing technique, Koshi-Waza.

Technique description 
In Judo's version, tori lifts uke by lifting with the core and abdomen, and then guides uke to the ground in front of tori.

Technique history

Similar techniques, variants, and aliases 
Aliases:
Choke Slam

References 

 Ohlenkamp, Neil (2006) Judo Unleashed basic reference on judo. .

External links
 The Techniques of Judo
 Ushiro goshi images
 Ushiro goshi demonstration

Judo technique
Throw (grappling)